SXRD (Silicon X-tal Reflective Display) is Sony's proprietary variant of liquid crystal on silicon, a technology used mainly in projection televisions and video projectors. In the front and rear-projection television market, it competes directly with JVC's D-ILA and Texas Instruments' DLP. Sony has discontinued the production of all of its rear-projection televisions, including those that used SXRD display chips, in favor of flat-panel sets utilizing LCD and OLED displays. Sony has now concentrated SXRD on HD home front-projectors and next generation 4K digital theater projection.

Models

The following SXRD-branded products have been released or announced:

Controversy

While capable of producing good high definition picture quality, Sony have had problems mastering the technology of mass-producing the rear projector version of these displays. A high failure rate of the optical block has required repeated replacements of the optical blocks on some televisions.  Sony previously settled a class-action lawsuit filed by owners of the first generation of the SXRDs, and apparently failed to fix this defect. Sony ceased production of all SXRD rear projector sets, as owners of most second-generation sets filed new class-action lawsuits. The second generation class-action suits were recently filed and are pending in Federal Court.

References

External links
SonyStyle VPL-VW40 product page
All Engadget SXRD articles
Sony Professional SXRD Site
Sony optical block problems site

Sony hardware
Japanese inventions